Maple High School (MHS) is a high school in Maple, Ontario, Canada. The current principal of Maple High School is Patrick McQuade. In 2017, it became an International Baccalaureate World School along with Milliken Mills High School, Dr. G.W. Williams Secondary School and Alexander Mackenzie High School.

Sports teams
As of 2017 Maple High School has offered the following sports teams:

Senior and Junior Girls Basketball
Senior and Junior Boys Basketball
Varsity Boys Soccer
Senior and Junior Girls Volleyball
Senior and Junior Boys Volleyball
Co-Ed Volleyball
Varsity Girls Flag football
Varsity Boys Baseball
Cricket Club
Badminton
Tennis
Golf
Cross country
Track and field
Alpine skiing and Snowboarding
Rock climbing
Ultimate Frisbee
Ice hockey
Swimming

School clubs
As of 2021, Maple High School has offered the following clubs:

Announcement Crew
Art Club
Chess Club
Computer Science Club
Debate Club
Dramatic Arts Council
Eco Team
Future Health Professionals (HOSA)
Interfaith Student Council
Intention For Infinity
Mock Trial Club
Model United Nations
Multicultural Committee
Photography Club
Prom Committee
Robotics Club
Student Council
Tamil Student Association (TSA)
Yearbook Committee
Medcreate

Notable alumni
 Adam Mascherin - ice hockey player

See also
List of high schools in Ontario

References

External links
Maple High School official website
York Region District School Board

York Region District School Board
High schools in the Regional Municipality of York
Education in Vaughan
Educational institutions established in 2002
2002 establishments in Ontario